Riot Musik is the second and final album by Junior M.A.F.I.A. It was released on April 19, 2005, by Mege Media Records.

Production
Guests on the album include Jadakiss, Blake C (formerly known as Trife), Boss Money, Prodigy and Aja. The audio production was by China Black, DJ Twinz, L.F. Daze, Sha Money XL and more.

Track listing

References

Junior M.A.F.I.A. albums
2005 albums